Poplar Island is a bar island in Marion County, West Virginia on the Tygart Valley River.

See also 
 List of islands of West Virginia
 Poplar Island (Chesapeake Bay) in Talbot County, Maryland
 Poplar Island (Fishing Bay) in Dorchester County, Maryland

River islands of West Virginia
Landforms of Marion County, West Virginia